Shyngyrlau (Şyñğyrlau) is a village in north-western Kazakhstan. It is the administrative center of Shyngyrlau District in West Kazakhstan Region. Population:

References

Populated places in West Kazakhstan Region